Frank Spraggon (born 27 October 1945) is an English former footballer who played in the Football League for Middlesbrough and Hartlepool United.

External links
 

English footballers
English expatriate footballers
English Football League players
North American Soccer League (1968–1984) players
1945 births
Living people
Middlesbrough F.C. players
Minnesota Kicks players
Hartlepool United F.C. players
Expatriate soccer players in the United States
Association football defenders
English expatriate sportspeople in the United States